First Provincial assembly election was held in Punjab in the winter of 1936-37 as mandated by the Government of India Act 1935.

Background
After the passing of Government of India act 1935, Provincial assembly was set up in Punjab. It consisted 175 constituencies. Out of these 159 were single-member constituencies and 8 were double-members constituencies. In double-members constituencies one was reserved for the Schedule Caste according to Poona Pact. In double constituencies each voter had two votes to cast his vote, one for SC candidate and one for general candidate but considered as one vote to calculate voter turnout.

All 175 constituencies were reserved on the basis of religion. It was as follows:-

^Special constituencies (non-territory constituency) were further divided into Categories and sub-categories as follow:-
 Women - 4
General - 1
Mohammadans - 2
Sikhs - 1
 European - 1
 Anglo-Indian - 1
 Indian Christian - 2
 Punjab Commerce and Industry - 1
 Landholders - 5
General - 1
Mohammadans - 3
Sikhs - 1
 Trade and Labour Unions - 3
 University - 1

Election schedule
The election schedule was as follows:-

Voter Statistics
During 1937 election there were total 27,84,646 voters. Out of these 64.23% voters cast their votes.

26,66,149 voters were in Territorial Constituencies and 1,18,497 were in Non-Territorial Constituencies.

In territorial constituencies the highest number of voters (39,290) were in '24-Hoshiarpur West (General-Rural)' and lowest number of voters (5,496) were in '62-Tarn Taran (Muhammadan-Rural)'. The highest vote turnout (89.87%) registered in '81-Shahpur (Muhammadan-Rural)' and lowest (3.93%) registered in '122-Ambala North (Sikh-Rural)'.

In Non-Territorial Constituencies the highest number of voters (58,106) were in '153-Amritsar (Women-Sikh)' and lowest number of voters (10) were in '163-Baluch Tumandars (Landholders)'. Highest vote turnout (98.35%) was registered in '158-Punjab Commerce and Industry (Commerce and Industry)' and lowest (40.53%) registered in '151-Inner Lahore (Women-Mohammadan)'.

Results

Category wise result

Special (18)
 Women (4)
 General (1)
 Indian National Congress - 1
 Mohammadans (2)
 Independents - 2
 Sikhs (1)
 Shiromani Akali Dal - 1
 European (1)
 Independent - 1
 Anglo Indian (1)
 Independent - 1
 Indian Christian (2)
 Unionist Party - 2
 Punjab Commerce and Industry (1)
 Independent - 1
 Landholders (5)
 General (1)
 Hindu Election Board - 1
 Mohammadans (3)
 Unionist Party - 3
 Sikhs (1)
 Khalsa National Party - 1
 Trade and Labour Unions (3)
 Hindu Election Board - 1
 Indian National Congress - 1
 Unionist Party - 1
 University (1)
 Independent - 1

Constituency wise result

Color key for the Party of Candidates
 
  
 

  

Other color keys

General Urban

General Rural

Muhammadan Urban

Muhammadan Rural

Sikh Urban

Sikh Rural

Special

Government formation

After the result Unionist party got majority in the assembly on its own. Unionist Party leader Sikandar Hayat Khan claimed the formation of Government in the State. Khalsa National Board and Hindu Election Board also joined the government.

On 5 April 1937 Sikandar Hayat Khan formed the Government and 5 other members also took oath. The ministers and their ministries were as follows:-

On 2 April 1941 after the death of Sundar Singh Majithia, the ministry of Development was handed over to Dasaundha Singh (KNP) from  Jagraon (Sikh-Rural) constituency. In 1942 after Sikandar-Baldev Pact KNP leader and minister Dasaundha Singh was removed from the cabinet and Baldev Singh joined the cabinet.

On 26 December 1945 Sikandar Hayat Khan died due to a heart attack. Malik Khizar Hayat Tiwana succeeded him on 30 December 1945.

See also
Zimni elections in Pakistan

References

Political history of India
Political history of Pakistan
1937 elections in India
1937 in British India
State Assembly elections in Punjab, India
Punjab